The Never Land Books or Never Land Adventures are a series of short chapter books set in Never Land, the home of Peter Pan.  They are based on the situations and characters established in the novel Peter and the Starcatchers and its sequels.  Like the novels, they are written by Pulitzer Prize-winning humorist Dave Barry and suspense novelist Ridley Pearson, and illustrated by Greg Call.  Although five Never Land books were planned, only three were published, in 2006–2008.  The stories focus on supporting characters from the novels, such as the Mollusk Island Natives, mermaids, pirates, and Lost Boys.  They include:

Escape from the Carnivale (August 2006)
Cave of the Dark Wind (July 2007)
Blood Tide (September 2008)

The books are published by Hyperion Books (a subsidiary of The Walt Disney Company) in defiance of a copyright claim of Great Ormond Street Hospital of London, to which writer J. M. Barrie gave the Peter Pan works in 1929, as confirmed in his will. GOSH has argued that United States copyright law gives them exclusive rights to the characters and setting until 2023. Disney argues that the copyright had already expired in the U.S. when Congress extended the term to the length claimed by GOSH.

See also

Peter and Wendy
Peter and the Starcatchers
Peter and the Shadow Thieves
Peter and the Secret of Rundoon
Peter and the Sword of Mercy
The Bridge to Never Land

References

External links
Pearson's web page about the books

review of Escape from Carnivale
review of Escape from Carnivale
review of Cave of the Dark Wind

Fantasy short stories
Works based on Peter Pan